Legislative elections were held in Equatorial Guinea on 25 April 2004. They were won by the Democratic Party of Equatorial Guinea of President Teodoro Obiang Nguema Mbasogo, which won 68 of the 100 seats in the Chamber of People's Representatives.

Results

Legislative elections in Equatorial Guinea
Equatorial
Election
Election and referendum articles with incomplete results
April 2004 events in Africa